Mount Jimmy Jimmy is a  glaciated mountain located in the Coast Mountains in southwestern British Columbia, Canada. Mt. Jimmy Jimmy is the highest point of the Tzoonie-Clowhom Divide. Precipitation runoff from the peak and meltwater from its immense glaciers drains into tributaries of the Squamish River and Clowhom River. The mountain was named for Chief Jimmy Jimmy (native name Swahsh), a leader of the Squamish Nation, who had traplines in the vicinity of the mountain. The mountain's name was officially adopted on June 6, 1957, by the Geographical Names Board of Canada.

Climate
Based on the Köppen climate classification, Mount Jimmy Jimmy is located in the marine west coast climate zone of western North America. Most weather fronts originate in the Pacific Ocean, and travel east toward the Coast Mountains where they are forced upward by the range (Orographic lift), causing them to drop their moisture in the form of rain or snowfall. As a result, the Coast Mountains experience high precipitation, especially during the winter months in the form of snowfall. Temperatures can drop below −20 °C with wind chill factors below −30 °C. July through September offer the best months to catch favorable weather for climbing Mount Jimmy Jimmy.

See also

Geography of British Columbia
Geology of British Columbia

References

External links
Climbing Mt. Jimmy Jimmy: YouTube
 Weather forecast: Mount Jimmy Jimmy
Mount Jimmy Jimmy
Mount Jimmy Jimmy: Nine out of Ten

Two-thousanders of British Columbia
Pacific Ranges
New Westminster Land District